Audifia duodecimpunctata is a species of cobweb spider in the family Theridiidae. It is found in Guinea-Bissau and the Congo.

References

Theridiidae
Spiders described in 1907